Voravongsa II (or Thammikarath Vorouvongsa II) (b. 1585- d. 1622) was the king of the Laotian Kingdom of Lan Xa reigning from 1596 to 1621.

He was the son of Vorapita and Princess Dharmagayi, the youngest daughter of King Phothisarath I.

He succeeded his cousin in 1596. Reigned under the regency of his father. He was captured by rebels and proclaimed king in 1599.  
Reconciled with his father, who renounced the regency, was crowned with the reign name of Vara Varman Dharmika Raja Jaya in 1603.

One of his several wives was Nang Kaen (married in 1596), a former consort of his father, Brhat Varapitra Vorapita.

In 1621 he was deposed by his son, and killed on his orders. He had five sons, including Ouphagnauvarath King of Lan Xang for nine months since 1621

References 

Kings of Lan Xang
16th-century births
1622 deaths
17th-century Laotian people
17th-century monarchs in Asia
Laotian Theravada Buddhists
16th-century Laotian people